James Nance may refer to:

James J. Nance (1900–1984), American industrialist
James C. Nance (1893–1984), American state legislator and newspaper publisher
James C. Nance (scientist) (born 1927), American scientist
James W. Nance (1921–1999), United States Navy officer and Congressional aide
 Jim Nance (1942–1992), American football player

See also
James C. Nance Memorial Bridge, Oklahoma, United States